Great Yarmouth and Gorleston lifeboat station (not to be confused with  on the Isle of Wight) is a RNLI base in Norfolk, England. There were originally two separate stations at Great Yarmouth and Gorleston – two coastal towns either side of the River Yare. These were merged in 1926.

History

Great Yarmouth
Great Yarmouth received its first lifeboat in 1802. It was never called out.

In 1825 the Norfolk Association for Saving the Lives of Shipwrecked Mariners stationed its first lifeboat at Great Yarmouth. The station was taken over by the RNLI in 1857 and in 1859 a new lifeboat house was built at a cost of £375. The station closed in 1919.

Gorleston
The Gorleston lifeboat station was established by the RNLI in 1866. In 1881 a new boathouse was built at Gorleston for £329 and in 1883 a second boathouse (Gorleston No.2) was built alongside. This closed in 1926 when Gorleston No.1 station was renamed Great Yarmouth and Gorleston.

During 1897 the station received its first steam lifeboat City of Glasgow and during 1921 its first motor lifeboat.

Great Yarmouth and Gorleston
In 1963 an inshore lifeboat station was established with a D class lifeboat that remained in service until 1978.

In 1975 a B class Atlantic 21 lifeboat was sent to the station.

During 1993 crew facilities were upgraded, a gift-shop built and a display area created for the former Gorleston lifeboat John and Mary Meiklam of Gladswood. The boathouse was further extended in 2002.

In 1996 Princess Alexandra, The Hon Lady Ogilvy officially named the station's new Trent class lifeboat Samarbeta, Swedish for ‘working together’.

The current lifeboats on station are the Trent class (14-10) Samarbeta and the B class (B925) John Rowntree.

Notable rescues
In October 1922 the Gorleston pulling and sailing lifeboat and the Lowestoft motor lifeboat, after a struggle lasting 32 hours, brought to safety the whole crew of 24 and a black kitten from the steamship  wrecked on Scroby Sands.

In 1927 lifeboats from Great Yarmouth & Gorleston, Cromer, Southwold and Lowestoft took part in the rescue of the Dutch oil tanker . This service is considered to be one of the greatest in the history of the RNLI.

The lifeboat Louise Stephens was one of 19 lifeboats involved in the Dunkirk evacuation of 1940.

Lifeboat disasters

Fleet

Great Yarmouth Fleet 
1825-1919

Gorleston Fleet

No. 1 Station

No. 2 Station

No. 3 Station

No. 4 Station

Great Yarmouth and Gorleston Fleet

All Weather Boats

Inshore Lifeboats

D-class

B-class

Honours
The station has been awarded 1 gold medal, 21 silver medals, 24 bronze medals, 5 vellum inscriptions and 9 framed letters of thanks.

Over 100 lifeboat crew were given the Freedom of the Borough of Great Yarmouth in 1982.

See also
Gorleston
Great Yarmouth
List of RNLI stations

References

External links

RNLI Great Yarmouth and Gorleston Lifeboat Station

Lifeboat stations in Norfolk
Great Yarmouth
Gorleston-on-Sea